The 2017 All-Big 12 Conference football team consists of American football players chosen as All-Big 12 Conference players for the 2017 Big 12 Conference football season.  The conference recognizes two official All-Big 12 selectors: (1) the Big 12 conference coaches selected separate offensive and defensive units and named first- and second-team players (the "Coaches" team); and (2) a panel of sports writers and broadcasters covering the Big 12 also selected offensive and defensive units and named first- and second-team players (the "Media" team).

Offensive selections

Quarterbacks

 Baker Mayfield, Oklahoma (Coaches-1; Media-1)
 Mason Rudolph, Oklahoma State (Coaches-2; Media-2)

Running backs

 David Montgomery, Iowa State (Coaches-1; Media-1)
 Justice Hill, Oklahoma State (Coaches-1; Media-1)
 Rodney Anderson, Oklahoma (Coaches-2; Media-2)
 Justin Crawford, West Virginia (Coaches-2; Media-2)

Fullbacks

 Dimitri Flowers, Oklahoma (Coaches-1)
 Winston Dimel, Kansas State (Coaches-2)

Centers

 Erick Wren, Oklahoma (Coaches-1; Media-1)
 Brad Lundblade, Oklahoma State (Coaches-1; Media-2)

Guards

 Marcus Keyes, Oklahoma State (Media-1)
 Ben Powers, Oklahoma (Coaches-2; Media-1)
 Dru Samia, Oklahoma (Coaches-2; Media-2)
 Matt Pryor, TCU (Coaches-2; Media-2)

Tackles

 Orlando Brown, Oklahoma (Coaches-1; Media-1)
 Dalton Risner, Kansas State (Coaches-1; Media-1)
 Zach Crabtree, Oklahoma State (Coaches-1; Media-2)
 Jake Campos, Iowa State (Coaches-2; Media-2)
 Yodny Cajuste, West Virginia (Coaches-2)

Tight ends

 Mark Andrews, Oklahoma (Coaches-1; Media-1)
 Ben Johnson, Kansas (Coaches-2; Media-2)
 Chase Allen, Iowa State (Coaches-2)

Receivers

 James Washington, Oklahoma State (Coaches-1; Media-1)
 David Sills, West Virginia (Coaches-1; Media-1)
 Allen Lazard, Iowa State (Coaches-1; Media-2)
 Keke Coutee, Texas Tech (Coaches-2; Media-2)
 Denzel Mims, Baylor (Coaches-2)
 Marcell Ateman, Oklahoma State (Coaches-2)
 Gary Jennings Jr., West Virginia (Coaches-2)

Defensive selections

Defensive linemen

 Mat Boesen, TCU (Coaches-1; Media-1)
 Poona Ford, Texas (Coaches-1; Media-1)
 Will Geary, Kansas State (Coaches-1; Media-1)
 DeQuinton Osborne, Oklahoma State (Coaches-1; Media-2)
 Daniel Wise, Kansas (Coaches-1; Media-2)
 Ben Banogu, TCU (Media-1)
 Dorance Armstrong Jr., Kansas (Coaches-2; Media-2)
 Jordan Brailford, Oklahoma State (Coaches-2; Media-2)
 JD Waggoner, Iowa State (Coaches-2)
 Reggie Walker, Kansas State (Coaches-2)
 D.J. Ward, Oklahoma (Coaches-2)

Linebackers

 Ogbonnia Okoronkwo, Oklahoma (Coaches-1; Media-1)
 Malik Jefferson, Texas (Coaches-1; Media-1)
 Travin Howard, TCU (Coaches-1; Media-2)
 Joel Lanning, Iowa State (Coaches-2; Media-1)
 Joe Dineen Jr., Kansas (Coaches-2; Media-2)
 Dakota Allen, Texas Tech (Coaches-2; Media-2)

Defensive backs

 Kamari Cotton-Moya, Iowa State (Coaches-1; Media-1)
 D. J. Reed, Kansas State (Coaches-1; Media-1)
 DeShon Elliott, Texas (Coaches-1; Media-1)
 Ranthony Texada, TCU (Coaches-1; Media-1)
 Tre Flowers, Oklahoma State (Coaches-1; Media-2)
 Nick Orr, TCU (Coaches-1; Media-2)
 Brian Peavy, Iowa State (Coaches-2; Media-2)
 Steven Parker, Oklahoma (Coaches-2)
 Jah'Shawn Johnson, Texas Tech (Coaches-2)
 Justus Parker, Texas Tech (Coaches-2)
 Kyzir White, West Virginia (Coaches-2)
 Kris Boyd, Texas (Media-2)

Special teams

Kickers

 Matthew McCrane, Kansas State (Coaches-1; Media-1)
 Austin Seibert, Oklahoma (Coaches-2; Media-2)

Punters

 Michael Dickson, Texas (Coaches-1; Media-1)
 Nick Walsh, Kansas State (Coaches-2; Media-2)

All-purpose / Return specialists

 KaVontae Turpin, TCU (Coaches-1; Media-1)
 D. J. Reed, Kansas State (Coaches-1; Media-2)
 Marcus Simms, West Virginia (Coaches-2)

Key
Bold = selected as a first-team player by both the coaches and media panel

Coaches = selected by Big 12 Conference coaches

Media = selected by a media panel

See also
2017 College Football All-America Team

References

All-Big 12 Conference
All-Big 12 Conference football teams